The Dead Rabbit, also known as The Dead Rabbit Grocery and Grog, is a craft cocktail bar in the Financial District of Manhattan, New York City. The bar was founded in 2013 in its location on Water Street. It opened as a "cocktail emporium", evoking the drinking habits of 19th century New Yorkers.

The establishment was rated best bar in the world in 2016, as compiled by The World's 50 Best Bars. It was also named world's best bar at the Tales of the Cocktail competition.

In 2022, the bar announced plans to open locations in New Orleans and Austin, Texas, as well as a sister bar in Charleston. One of the bar's owners will work with its beverage director to establish the Charleston bar, while still remaining a silent partner at The Dead Rabbit. A new beverage director would be named for The Dead Rabbit bar.

The bar is in the Fraunces Tavern Block Historic District, a National Historic Landmark District and a New York City designated landmark district.

The establishment has three stories, including a ground-floor taproom with basic drinks, a second-floor parlor with craft cocktails, and a third floor, a private room for parties.

References

External links

 

Drinking establishments in Manhattan
Financial District, Manhattan